Abagrotis reedi is a moth of the family Noctuidae first described by John S. Buckett in 1969. It is found in North America, from California, east to Arizona, Colorado and Iowa into Canada where it is found in Manitoba, Saskatchewan, Alberta and British Columbia.

The wingspan is 33–36 mm.

References

reedi
Moths of North America
Moths described in 1969